Valery Kuzmich Polyansky (Russian: Валерий Кузьмич Полянский; born April 19, 1949 in Moscow) is a Russian orchestral and choral conductor. He is a professor of the Moscow Conservatory, People's Artist of Russia (1996), artistic director, chief conductor and founder of the State Symphony Capella of Russia.

Awards and honors
State Prize of the Russian Federation in the field of literature and the arts in 1995

References

External links
Biography

1949 births
Living people
State Prize of the Russian Federation laureates
People's Artists of Russia
21st-century Russian conductors (music)
Russian male conductors (music)
21st-century Russian male musicians